Toplis is a surname. Notable people with the surname include:

 Chioma Toplis (born 1972), Nigerian actress
 Percy Toplis (1896–1920), British imposter